The Immigration Museum focuses on Melbourne and Victoria’s immigration history and celebrates the diversity of the community through shared storytelling. Located on Flinders Street in Melbourne, Victoria in the Old Customs House, the heritage building was a reflection of vastly expanded trade and soaring revenue from the goldrush.  Customs House was built, between 1855 and 1876, to be one of Melbourne's grand buildings.

The museum's most important space, the Long Room, is a notable piece of Renaissance Revival architecture.

The museum was founded in 1998, and is a division of Museums Victoria, which administers the cultural and scientific collections of the State of Victoria. Its sister museums are Melbourne Museum (including the Royal Exhibition Building) and Scienceworks Museum.

In addition to its work on documenting immigration history, the museum also hosts various travelling exhibitions, and also provides educational programs. The courtyard of the museum is utilised to host community festivals which are an amalgamation of food, music and culture. It contains the Tribute Garden which honours immigrants from more than 90 countries.

References

External links

 Immigration Museum website

Museums in Melbourne
History museums in Australia
Buildings and structures in Melbourne City Centre
Museums of human migration
Museums established in 1998
1998 establishments in Australia
Museums in Victoria (Australia)
Tourist attractions in Victoria (Australia)

Maritime museums in Australia